East Coast Bays is a New Zealand parliamentary electorate. It was first formed in 1972 and has existed apart from a break lasting two parliamentary terms. The electorate has been held by Erica Stanford of the National Party since the 2017 general election.

Population centres
There were 84 electorates for the 1969 election, and the 1972 electoral redistribution saw three additional general seats created for the North Island, bringing the total number of electorates to 87. Together with increased urbanisation in Christchurch and Nelson, the changes proved very disruptive to existing electorates. In the South Island, three electorates were abolished, and three electorates were newly created. In the North Island, five electorates were abolished, two electorates were recreated, and six electorates were newly created (including East Coast Bays).

The electorate is based around the north-eastern suburbs of North Shore City in north Auckland, including Torbay, Browns Bay and Mairangi Bay. The electorate crosses State Highway One at its southern end, which includes a section of Glenfield. East Coast Bays is a wealthy electorate, with incomes above the national average and boasting some of the most expensive real estate in the country. The electorate also contains many immigrants from South Africa.

History

Although now a safe electorate for National, it was held for seven years by Social Credit MP Gary Knapp, from the  when he defeated future National party leader Don Brash.

But in  the declining fortunes of the Democratic Party (as Social Credit renamed itself), led to Knapp being defeated by Murray McCully, who held the electorate for National until 2017.

In December 2016, McCully announced that he would not stand for parliament in the 2017 general election, and the seat of East Coast Bays was won by Erica Stanford, retaining it for the National Party.

Members of Parliament
Key

    

1 Resigned when appointed Ambassador to the United States

List MPs
Members of Parliament elected from party lists in elections where that person also unsuccessfully contested the East Coast Bays electorate. Unless otherwise stated, all MPs terms began and ended at general elections.

2Bradford resigned from Parliament on 30 October 2009.

Election results

2020 election

2017 election

2014 election

2011 election

Electorate (as at 26 November 2011): 47,305

2008 election

2005 election

2002 election

1993 election

1990 election

1987 election

1984 election

1981 election

1980 by-election

1978 election

1975 election

1972 election

Notes

References

External links
Electorate Profile  Parliamentary Library

New Zealand electorates in the Auckland Region
Politics of the Auckland Region
1972 establishments in New Zealand
1996 disestablishments in New Zealand
2002 establishments in New Zealand
East Coast Bays